Michal Vacek (born  in Prague) is a Czech bobsledder.

Vacek competed at the 2014 Winter Olympics for the Czech Republic. He teamed with driver Jan Vrba in the two-man event, finishing 24th, and with Vrba, Dominik Dvořák and Dominik Suchý in the four-man event, finishing 16th.

As of April 2014, his best showing at the World Championships is 12th, in the 2013 four-man event.

Vacek made his World Cup debut in November 2012. As of April 2014, his best finish is 5th, in a four-man event in 2012-13 at Altenberg.

References

1987 births
Living people
Olympic bobsledders of the Czech Republic
Sportspeople from Prague
Bobsledders at the 2014 Winter Olympics
Czech male bobsledders